Roque Martinez (born March 4, 1986) is a Guamanian mixed martial artist who competes in the Heavyweight division. He has formerly competed in the Ultimate Fighting Championship and Rizin Fighting Federation.

Background
Born and raised on Guam until 12 years old, Martinez went to high school in Washington state. Along with two close friend, he signed up for fighting classes for fun. With time, the other two fell out of the sport, but Martinez kept fighting, until at the age of 27, he had first professional fight on Guam.

Mixed martial arts career

Early career
Martinez compiled a 9–3–2 record on the regional Guamanian and Asian scene, with his most notable bout being a victory against Jung Da Un.

Rizin Fighting Federation. 
Martinez won the DEEP Megatonweight Championship against Jaideep Singh at Deep Cage Impact 2017: At Korakuen Hall on July 15, 2017. He won the bout and title via unanimous decision.

The next bout was against Jérôme Le Banner at Rizin World Grand Prix 2017: Opening Round – Part 2 on October 15, 2017. He won the bout via a first round scarf hold.

Martinez faced Kiyoshi Kuwabara at Rizin 12 on August 12, 2018. He won the bout via TKO in the first round.

Martinez faced Mirko Cro Cop at Rizin 13 on September 30, 2018. He lost the bout after Cro Cop opened a cut on Roque's forehead and the ring doctor stopped the bout.

The first title defense of the DEEP Megatonweight Championship came against Ryo Sakai at DEEP 88 Impact on March 9, 2019. He won the bout via TKO at the end of the first round.

Martinez faced Jake Heun at Rizin 16 on June 2, 2019. Despite breaking his hand in the first round, Martinez lost a close bout via split decision.

Martinez defended the DEEP Megatonweight Championship against Seigo Mizuguchi at Deep 93 Impact on December 15, 2019. He won the bout via TKO in the second round.

Martinez faced Hideki Sekine at Rizin 21 on February 22, 2020. He won the bout via TKO after finishing Sekine off with soccer kicks and punches.

Ultimate Fighting Championship
Martinez  made his debut on September 12, 2020, at UFC Fight Night: Waterson vs. Hill, when he lost to Alexander Romanov via arm-triangle choke in the second round.

Martinez faced Don'Tale Mayes on November 14, 2020 UFC Fight Night: Felder vs. dos Anjos. He lost the fight via unanimous decision.

Martinez faced Josh Parisian at UFC on ESPN: The Korean Zombie vs. Ige on June 19, 2021. He lost the bout via controversial split decision. 12 out of 14 media scores gave the victory to Martinez.

On June 29, 2021, after his third straight loss, Martinez was released from the UFC.

Post UFC 
Making his return after almost a year and a half away, Martinez faced Yuichi Yokoyama on November 11, 2022 at Brawl International 2, winning the bout via rear-naked choke in the first round.

Background 
Besides his mixed martial arts career, Martinez works as an insurance adjuster.

Championships and accomplishments

Mixed martial arts 

 Deep
 DEEP Megatonweight Championship (One Time)
Two successful title defenses

Mixed martial arts record

|-
|Win
|align=center|16–8–2
|Yuichi Yokoyama
|Submission (rear-naked choke)
|Brawl International 2
|
|align=center|1
|align=center|1:55
|Tumon, Guam
|
|-
|Loss
|align=center|15–8–2
|Josh Parisian
|Decision (split)
|UFC on ESPN: The Korean Zombie vs. Ige
|
|align=center|3
|align=center|5:00
|Las Vegas, Nevada, United States
|
|-
| Loss
| align=center|15–7–2
|Don'Tale Mayes
| Decision (unanimous)
| UFC Fight Night: Felder vs. dos Anjos
| 
| align=center|3
| align=center|5:00
| Las Vegas, Nevada, United States
|
|-
| Loss
| align=center|15–6–2
|Alexander Romanov
| Submission (arm-triangle choke)
|UFC Fight Night: Waterson vs. Hill
|
|align=center|2
|align=center|4:22
|Las Vegas, Nevada, United States
|
|-
| Win
| align=center|15–5–2
|Hideki Sekine
|TKO (soccer kicks and punches)
|Rizin 21
|
|align=center|1
|align=center|4:04
|Hamamatsu, Japan
|
|-
| Win
| align=center|14–5–2
| Seigo Mizuguchi
|TKO (punches)
|Deep 93 Impact
|
|align=center|2
|align=center|2:09
|Tokyo, Japan
|
|-
| Loss
| align=center|13–5–2
| Jake Heun
| Decision (split)
| Rizin 16
| 
| align=center| 3
| align=center| 5:00
| Kobe, Japan
|
|-
| Win
| align=center|13–4–2
| Ryo Sakai
|TKO (punches and elbows)
|DEEP 88 Impact
|
|align=center| 1
|align=center| 4:59
|Tokyo, Japan
|
|-
| Loss
| align=center|12–4–2
| Mirko Cro Cop
| TKO (doctor stoppage)
| Rizin 13
| 
| align=center|1
| align=center|4:58
| Saitama, Japan
|
|-
| Win
| align=center|12–3–2
| Kiyoshi Kuwabara
| TKO (punches)
|Rizin 12
|
|align=center|1
|align=center|4:33
|Nagoya, Japan
| 
|-
| Win
| align=center| 11–3–2
|Jérôme Le Banner
| Submission (scarf hold)
| Rizin World Grand Prix 2017: Opening Round – Part 2
| 
| align=center| 1
| align=center| 2:09
| Fukuoka, Japan
|
|-
| Win
| align=center| 
|Jaideep Singh
|Decision (unanimous)
|Deep Cage Impact 2017: At Korakuen Hall
|
|align=center|3
|align=center|5:00
|Tokyo, Japan
|
|-
| Draw
| align=center|9–3–2
|Sang Soo Lee
|Draw (majority)
|Top FC 12
|
|align=center|3
|align=center|5:00
|Seoul, South Korea
|
|-
| Win
| align=center| 9–3–1
| Kelvin Fitial
|Decision (unanimous)
|Pacific Xtreme Combat 54
|
|align=center|3
|align=center|5:00
|Mangilao, Guam
|
|-
| Win
| align=center| 8–3–1
|Takaaki Oban
| TKO (punches)
| Pacific Xtreme Combat 52
| 
| align=center| 2
| align=center| N/A
| Mangilao, Guam
|
|-
| Win
| align=center|7–3–1
| Da Un Jung
| Submission (kimura)
| Top FC 9
| 
| align=center| 1
| align=center| 4:30
| Incheon, South Korea
| 
|-
| Win
| align=center|6–3–1
| Doo Hwan Kim
| Decision (split)
|Top FC 7
|
| align=center|3
| align=center|5:00
|Changwon, South Korea
|
|-
| Win
| align=center|5–3–1
| Mylo Lassiter
| Decision (unanimous)
|Pacific Xtreme Combat 36
|
|align=center|3
|align=center|5:00
|Mangilao, Guam
| 
|-
| Loss
| align=center|4–3–1
| Kelvin Fitial
| TKO (punches and elbows)
| Pacific Xtreme Combat 24
| 
| align=center| 4
| align=center| 4:52
| Manila, Philippines
| 
|-
| Draw
| align=center|4–2–1
| Kelvin Fitial
|Draw
|Pacific Xtreme Combat 22
|
|align=center| 5
|align=center| 5:0
|Mangilao, Guam
|
|-
| Loss
| align=center|4–2
|Kazuhisa Tazawa
|Submission (achilles lock)
|Deep: 47 Impact
|
|align=center|2
|align=center|2:11
|Tokyo, Japan
|
|-
| Loss
| align=center|4–1
|Yusuke Kawaguchi
| Decision (unanimous)
| Deep: Cage Impact 2009
| 
| align=center| 3
| align=center| 5:00
| Tokyo, Japan
| 
|-
| Win
| align=center| 4–0
| Charleston Aiken
|Submission (heel hook)
|Pacific Xtreme Combat 15
|
|align=center|2
|align=center|0:00
|Mangilao, Guam
|
|-
| Win
| align=center|3–0
| Manny Chong
|TKO (punches)
|Pacific Xtreme Combat 13
|
| align=center|1
| align=center|0:00
|Mangilao, Guam
|
|-
| Win
| align=center| 2–0
| Charleston Aiken
| TKO
|Pacific Xtreme Combat 11
|
| align=center|2
| align=center|0:00
|Mangilao, Guam
|
|-
| Win
| align=center|1–0
| Toby Mesa
| TKO (elbows)
|Pacific Xtreme Combat Live 1
|
|align=center|1
|align=center|3:29
|Tamuning, Guam
|

See also 
 List of male mixed martial artists

References

External links 
  
 

Living people
1986 births
People from Tamuning, Guam
Guamanian male mixed martial artists
Heavyweight mixed martial artists
Ultimate Fighting Championship male fighters